The Immediate Geographic Region of Mantena is one of the 4 immediate geographic regions in the Intermediate Geographic Region of Governador Valadares, one of the 70 immediate geographic regions in the Brazilian state of Minas Gerais and one of the 509 of Brazil, created by the National Institute of Geography and Statistics (IBGE) in 2017.

Municipalities 
It comprises 7 municipalities.

 Central de Minas  
 Itabirinha     
 Mantena   
 Mendes Pimentel   
 Nova Belém   
 São Félix de Minas     
 São João do Manteninha

References 

Geography of Minas Gerais